Saint Joan the Maid or The Marvellous Life of Joan of Arc (French: La merveilleuse vie de Jeanne d'Arc) is a 1929 French-German silent historical drama film directed by Marco de Gastyne and starring Simone Genevois, Fernand Mailly and Georges Paulais.

Cast
 Simone Genevois as Jeanne d'Arc
 Fernand Mailly as La Hire
 Georges Paulais as Nicolas Loyseleur  
 Jean Debucourt as Charles VII
 Philippe Hériat as Gilles de Rais
 Gaston Modot as Lord Glasdall  
 Daniel Mendaille as Lord Talbot 
 Jean-Louis Allibert  
 Genica Athanasiou 
 Léonce Cargue

See also
 Cultural depictions of Joan of Arc

References

Bibliography
 Geoffrey Nowell-Smith. The Oxford History of World Cinema. Oxford University Press, 1997.

External links

1929 films
Films about Joan of Arc
Films of the Weimar Republic
Films directed by Marco de Gastyne
German silent feature films
French silent feature films
German historical drama films
French historical drama films
1920s historical drama films
Pathé films
German black-and-white films
French black-and-white films
1929 drama films
Silent historical drama films
Silent adventure films
Silent war films
1920s French films
1920s German films
French-language German films